Jean Denise Lambert (born Jean Denise Archer; 1 June 1950 in Orsett, Essex) is an English politician, and who served as a Member of the European Parliament for the London Region between 1999 and 2019.

Early life and career
She attended Palmer's Grammar School for Girls in Grays, Essex. Lambert gained a BA in Modern Languages in 1971 from University College, Cardiff, before taking a Postgraduate Certificate in Education (PGCE) from St Pauls' College (Francis Close Hall), Cheltenham (now the University of Gloucestershire) and gaining an ADB (Ed.) in 1975. She then worked as a secondary school teacher in Waltham Forest, East London, first from 1972–78, then from 1985–89 and finally between 1993 and 1999. She also holds a Professional Development Certificate (BTEC), which she achieved in 1998.

Political career

Green Party politician and MEP
After joining the Ecology Party in 1977 (later becoming the Green Party of England and Wales), Lambert has held numerous positions, including Co-Chair of the Party Council (1982–85), Principal Speaker (1992–93 and 1998–99), Chair of the Party Executive (1993–94), Representative to the Federation of European Green Parties (1987–89 and 1998–99) and Political Liaison to the Green Group in the European Parliament (1989–92). She is currently the party's spokesperson on Migration.

Lambert was first elected to the European Parliament in 1999 from the London Region, winning 87,545 votes (7.7% share). She was re-elected in 2004 with 8.4% of the vote (158,986 votes) and again in 2009 with 10.9% of the vote (190,589 votes), and again in 2014. As a Member of the European Parliament, she is or has been a member or substitute of the Employment and Social Affairs Committee, the Civil Liberties, Justice and Home Affairs Committee, the Subcommittee on Human Rights, the Intergroup on Disability and Gay and Lesbian Rights and Delegations to South Asia, Afghanistan, Japan and India. She chaired the South Asia Delegation from 2009–2019. She is Vice-President of the Intergroup on Ageing, the Intergroup on Anti-poverty and the Intergroup on Anti-racism and Diversity. She was Rapporteur on the Parliament's Asylum Report. She was Vice-President of the Greens/European Free Alliance Group of MEPs from 2002 to 2007, in which she is the Spokesperson on Asylum and Refugees. 
Lambert was also engaged in EU Election Observation missions, including as Chief Observer for the 2018 elections in Sierra Leone.

She is an active campaigner for the London Living Wage.

Non-party activism and advisory roles
Outside her work in the Green Party, Lambert is involved in numerous NGOs. Since 1991, she has been a Council Member of Charter 88, the democratic reform NGO, as well as an Executive Supporter and Signatory for Charter 99, described as "an initiative for global democracy". She has been Vice-President of the Waltham Forest Race Equality Council from 1999. She is a Trustee of the Dalit Solidarity Campaign UK. She is also on Advisory Boards of the Work-Life Institute and London Metropolitan University.

Awards
Lambert was named Justice and Human Rights MEP of the Year 2005, the first year these awards were held.

Writings
Lambert has written numerous reports and articles on her areas of interest, especially democracy and human rights, sustainable development, anti-discrimination, social inclusion, minority rights, trade union and workers' issues and asylum and refugee rights. She wrote No Change? No Chance, a book on Green politics, in 1996. Furthermore, she has made a film in 2006, EU4U! Your voice can make a difference!, highlighting the ways young people can make a difference within EU structures.

References

Bibliography, reports, briefings and films

 Film – EU4U! Your voice can make a difference!, 2006
 Lambert, J., Climate Change, Climate Crisis?, 2007
 Lambert, J., Lucas, C. P., European Parliament two-seat operation: Environmental costs, transport and energy, 2007
 Lambert, J., Hothouses: Climate Change and London's Housing, 2007
 Lambert, J., I Must Work Harder? Britain And The Working Time Directive, 2006
 Lambert, J., The Bolkestein Directive: Health Warning, 2005
 Lambert, J., So Much Hot Air?, 2005
 Green Group position on the services directive, 2005
 Lambert, J., Flexible Working: A Work Life Balance Or A Balancing Act?, 2004
 Lambert, J., What is Sustainable Development?, 2004
 Lambert, J., Integrating social inclusion and environment, 2003
 Jones, J., Lambert, J., Silent Slavery, 2003
 Lambert, J., Olivier, D., Toke, D., The Green Party Alternative Energy Review, 2003
 Lambert, J., General Agreement To Trade In Services: Response to European Commission Consultation Document, 2003
 Lambert, J., General Agreement On Trade In Services: Response to UK Consultation on Requests, 2002
 Lambert, J., Toke, D., Energy and Renewables, 2002
 Lambert, J., Lucas, C. P., The World Summit On Sustainable Development 2002, 2002
 Greens EFA Briefing on GMOs, 2002
 Lambert, J., Refugees and The Environment: The Forgotten Element Of Sustainability, 2002
 Lambert, J., No Change? No Chance, 1996

External links
 Jean Lambert MEP's official website
 Jean Lambert MEP's European Parliament biography
 Jean Lambert MEP's Green Party page

1950 births
Living people
Alumni of Cardiff University
Alumni of the University of Gloucestershire
English environmentalists
Green Party of England and Wales MEPs
Green Party of England and Wales politicians
MEPs for England 1999–2004
MEPs for England 2009–2014
MEPs for England 2014–2019
People from Orsett
20th-century women MEPs for England
21st-century women MEPs for England